Çan District is a district of the Çanakkale Province of Turkey. Its seat is the town of Çan. Its area is 905 km2, and its population is 48,023 (2021).

Composition
There are two municipalities in Çan District:
 Çan
 Terzialan

There are 65 villages in Çan District:

 Ahlatlıburun
 Alibeyçiftliği
 Altıkulaç
 Asmalı
 Bahadırlı
 Bardakçılar
 Bilaller
 Bostandere
 Bozguç
 Büyükpaşa
 Büyüktepe
 Çakılköy
 Çaltıkara
 Çamköy
 Çekiçler
 Cicikler
 Çomaklı
 Danapınar
 Derenti
 Dereoba
 Doğaca
 Doğancılar
 Dondurma
 Duman
 Durali
 Emeşe
 Eskiyayla
 Etili
 Göle
 Hacıkasım
 Hacılar
 Halilağa
 Helvacı
 Hurma
 İlyasağaçiftliği
 Kadılar
 Kalburcu
 Karadağ
 Karakadılar
 Karakoca
 Karlı
 Kazabat
 Keçiağılı
 Kızılelma
 Kocayayla
 Koyunyeri
 Kulfal
 Kumarlar
 Küçüklü
 Küçükpaşa
 Mallı
 Maltepe
 Okçular
 Ozancık
 Sameteli
 Şerbetli
 Söğütalanı
 Tepeköy
 Üvezdere
 Uzunalan
 Yaya
 Yaykın
 Yeniçeri
 Yuvalar
 Zeybekçayırı

References

Districts of Çanakkale Province